The Doll: A Portrait of My Mother is an autobiographical novel sketching Albanian author Ismail Kadare's relationship with his mother. It dwells upon the family's life in Gjirokastër and later in Tirana, "full of compelling details of life in a changing Albania", as well as on the author's own time as a student at the Gorky Institute in Moscow. While the portrait of his mother remains insubstantial, there are reflections upon the author's own youthful literary ambitions, and the nature of autocracy.

The work was first published in Albanian in 2015, and was translated into English by John Hodgson for publication by Harvill Secker in 2020.

References

2015 novels
21st-century Albanian novels
Novels by Ismail Kadare
Novels set in Albania
Novels set in Moscow
Novels set in the Stalin era
Onufri Publishing House books
Harvill Secker books